Mabe is common surname of those of Latin American origin with descendance from French, Dutch or Spanish influence. It is a shorten version of a longer name. It has been suggested to have religious ties or meaning to the Catholic religion. It is not unusual to see the e at the end with a dash above it, to help upon translation. It is currently the name of a large company in Mexico. 

Mabe is the surname of:

Bob Mabe (1929–2005), American Major League Baseball pitcher
Manabu Mabe (1924–1997), Japanese-Brazilian painter
Ricky Mabe (born 1983), Canadian actor
Taylor Mabe, guitarist and singer with the band Swift (2003-2005)
Tom Mabe, American comedian, prankster and stuntman